Grant County Schools is the operating school district within Grant County, in the U.S. state of West Virginia. It is governed by the Grant County Board of Education.

Schools

High schools
Petersburg High School

Elementary schools
Dorcas Elementary School
Maysville Elementary School
Petersburg Elementary School

K-12 schools
Union Educational Complex

Vocational schools
South Branch Career and Technical Center

Schools no longer in operation
Bayard Grade School
Bayard High School

References

External links
Grant County Schools

School districts in West Virginia
Education in Grant County, West Virginia